Radio Foča or Радио Фоча is a Bosnian local public radio station, broadcasting from Foča, Bosnia and Herzegovina.

It was launched on 26 November 1976 by the municipal council of Foča. In Yugoslavia and in SR Bosnia and Herzegovina, it was part of local/municipal Radio Sarajevo network affiliate. This radio station broadcasts a variety of programs such as music, sport, local news and talk shows. Program is mainly produced in Serbian language.

Estimated number of potential listeners of Radio Foča is around 24,758. Radiostation is also available in municipalities of Bosnian-Podrinje Canton Goražde.

Frequencies
 Foča

See also 
List of radio stations in Bosnia and Herzegovina

References

External links 
 www.fmscan.org
 www.radiofoca.com
 Communications Regulatory Agency of Bosnia and Herzegovina

Foča
Radio stations established in 1976